Petli Kand (also Romanized as Petlī Kand; also known as Petlī Kandī and Petlū Kandī) is a village in Savalan Rural District, in the Central District of Parsabad County, Ardabil Province, Iran. At the 2006 census, its population was 22, in 6 families.

References 

Towns and villages in Parsabad County